Aferdita Podvorica (born 10 September 1978) is a Kosovan-born Albanian women's football striker. She played for 1. FFC Turbine Potsdam.

References

External links

1978 births
Living people
Albanian women's footballers
Women's association football forwards
1. FFC Turbine Potsdam players
Albanian expatriate footballers
Albanian expatriate sportspeople in Germany
Expatriate women's footballers in Germany
Sportspeople from Podujevo
Kosovan women's footballers
Kosovan expatriate footballers
Kosovan expatriate sportspeople in Germany
Kosovan people of Albanian descent
Sportspeople of Albanian descent